MTV Unplugged is the fourth live CD by singer Beni. The DVD contains footage of Beni's first MTV unplugged live.

Track list: DVD

Track list: CD

Charts

References

Albums recorded at Billboard Live Tokyo
Beni (singer) albums
2012 live albums
2012 video albums
Live video albums